Toodyay, known as Newcastle between 1860 and 1910, is a town on the Avon River in the Wheatbelt region of Western Australia,  north-east of Perth. The first European settlement occurred in the area in 1836. After flooding in the 1850s, the townsite was moved to its current location in the 1860s. It is connected by railway and road to Perth. During the 1860s, it was home to bushranger Moondyne Joe.

History

Origin of the name 'Toodyay'

The meaning of the name is uncertain, although it is probably indigenous Noongar in origin. In an 1834 reference it is transcribed as "Toodye" while maps in 1836 referred to "Duidgee" The Shire of Toodyay's official website says that "[t]he name Toodyay is believed to be derived from an Aboriginal word 'Duidgee' which means 'place of plenty', referring to the richness and fertility of the area and the reliability of the Avon River". This meaning appears to be a long-standing belief in the local community, but may be based on an interpretation of an explanation by an Aboriginal guide about the value of the location rather than the literal meaning of the word.

An alternative meaning was ascribed by a research project headed by Professor Len Collard which provides the meaning as "today it is misty and foggy". Yet another version was more recently postulated by local anthropologists Ken Macintyre and Dr Barb Dobson, who provide a very erudite analysis which says that the name most likely mimics a birdcall, possibly the restless flycatcher or one of that family. The name in the form "Duidgee" is preserved in the riverside recreation area "Duidgee Park".

The Ballardong people of Duidgee
Before the arrival of Europeans, the Toodyay (Duidgee) region was owned by the Ballardong Noongar people, whose country extended from the Wongan Hills and beyond in the north to beyond Pingelly in the south, though the people whose land included present-day Toodyay probably numbered about 100 people and occupied the area from around Bolgart to Burlong Pool on the Avon River near Northam, a range of about 50 kilometres. The Avon River at Toodyay was a key site for food supply for the Ballardong, as was revealed to botanist and new landholder James Drummond as soon as he arrived in the area. The site was also located along the route taken by the river serpent, the Wagyl, in his seasonal underground travels between the spring at Bolgart and Burlong Pool. It had been a focal point of Ballardong life for thousands of years.

Old Toodyay, 1836-1860

The Avon River valley in which Toodyay was to be located was discovered for the white settlers by Ensign Robert Dale in 1830, leading to further exploration by settlers including James Drummond, Captain Francis Whitfield and Alexander Anderson. The first village of Toodyay was established in 1836, one of the earliest inland settlements in Western Australia. Drummond established his homestead Hawthornden a few kilometres to the north.

Newcastle, 1860-1910
This was proclaimed by Governor Arthur Kennedy on 1 October 1860 as "Newcastle" and the original settlement came to be referred to as "Old Toodyay".

The Newcastle Gaol, in Clinton Street, completed in 1864, was in use as a state prison until 1909. It is now preserved as a heritage building and tourist attraction, the Old Gaol Museum.

In 1870, a steam-driven flour mill, Connor's Mill, was built on Stirling Terrace by George Hasell. The mill was also used to generate electricity in the early twentieth century. Saved from demolition in the 1970s, and restored to demonstrate the milling process and machinery, the mill now forms the museum section of the Toodyay Visitor Centre.

Toodyay since 1910
In May 1910, due to confusion with the New South Wales city of Newcastle, a name-change to Toodyay was proposed and the original townsite, which had by this time declined substantially, became "West Toodyay".

The Heritage Council of Western Australia lists over one hundred places of historical significance in or near Toodyay, including cottages (some of which are now ruins), homesteads, shops, churches, parks and railway infrastructure. The State Register of Heritage Buildings includes the Gaol, Connor's Mill, Toodyay Public Library, the old Toodyay Post Office and the old Toodyay Fire Station, as well as several other historic sites. The historic architecture of shops and residences along the main street, Stirling Terrace, presents a distinctive frontage termed the Stirling Terrace Streetscape Group.

Some of the buildings are also listed on the Australian Heritage Database. They include the Freemasons Hotel, the Victoria Hotel, and Urwin's Store on Stirling Terrace, and Butterly's Cottage on Harper Road.

The current Toodyay District High School was established in 1954, replacing an older building constructed in 1886.

In 1986 the town was the location used to film the movie Shame.

Notable people

In 1861, Western Australia's notorious bushranger Moondyne Joe was imprisoned in Toodyay for stealing a horse, but escaped. After a series of crimes and prison terms, he was on the run again, returning to Toodyay in 1865 to steal supplies for an attempt to escape overland to South Australia. The annual Moondyne Festival is a light-hearted celebration of this darker side of Toodyay's history.

Tourism
See also Toodyay pioneer heritage trail
By the early 1920s Toodyay was being recognised for its potential to develop into a tourist destination, with ample accommodation, its link to WA colonial past, Moondyne Joe and the Newcastle Gaol as point of interest. Being an hour's drive from Perth, present day Toodyay is a popular venue for tourists. A picturesque circuit of Toodyay Road through Gidgegannup, Toodyay, Chittering Valley and Great Northern Highway attracts motorists. Other destinations include olive oil farms, lavender farms, holiday retreats, hotels, restaurants, caravan parks, an emu farm and a public archery park.

Transport

Railways

Historically, Newcastle was connected to the Western Australian Government Railways network by a line that left the Eastern Railway at Clackline, which then travelled through Western Toodyay to proceed to Bolgart and then on to Miling. This connection was changed when the Eastern Railway was re-routed through the Avon Valley in 1966. The Clackline connection was closed, and Toodyay became part of the main eastern railway route.

Toodyay railway station is currently served by Transwa AvonLink, MerredinLink and Prospector passenger trains on the route from Perth to Northam and Kalgoorlie.

Roads
Toodyay is connected to Perth by Toodyay Road, which runs in a south-westerly direction to Great Northern Highway in Middle Swan, Perth. Within Toodyay, it continues as the town's main street, Stirling Terrace. Other major roads radiating out from Toodyay are:
 Clackline Toodyay Road, heading south to Clackline on Great Eastern Highway
 Northam Toodyay Road, heading south-east to Northam and Great Eastern Highway
 Goomalling Toodyay Road, heading north-east to Goomalling
 Bindi Bindi Toodyay Road, heading north to Calingiri, and later Bindi Bindi on Great Northern Highway
 Bindoon Dewars Pool Road, heading north-west to Bindoon
 Julimar Road, heading west to Chittering
Toodyay is also the northern end of the Avon Historic Tourist Drive (Tourist Drive 254), which follows the Avon River to Beverley.

Motor racing
On 5 May 1947, a motor racing meeting took place, using the towns streets for the course. The circuit was in a clockwise direction, following the route Stirling Terrace (where the start and finish was located)-Henry Street-Duke Street-Fiennes Street-Templar Lane and back to Stirling Terrace. The main race of the meeting was the 30 mile Toodyay Speed Classic, which was won by Syd Barker. A second meeting was planned for 17 November 1948, to coincide with the King's Birthday holiday, but the holiday was cancelled, as was the race meeting.

Toodyay plays host to a leg of the Quit Targa West each year, normally on the Saturday of the event.

Waterways
Toodyay is located on the Avon River, which runs through to the Swan River in Perth. The annual Avon Descent sees a range of crafts make their way downriver through Toodyay, from the starting point at Northam.

Bushfires
Toodyay has been impacted by fires – a common occurrence in the summer months – since it was settled. Significant bushfires have regularly been reported in the area from as early as 1853. Two of the most devastating fires to threaten Toodyay have resulted from state government infrastructure, along with other smaller fires, including the spontaneous combustion of a dung heap at the Newcastle Police Stables.

On 10 December 1909 a fire was started by a train using the newly opened Newcastle–Bolgart Railway near Coondle; the fire was referred to as the most disastrous that had ever occurred in the area. It burnt an area of about 15 miles in length and up to 4 miles wide. Three hundred and fifty people fought the fire over two days before putting it out. A later flare up caused further damage to 600 acres of land, 500 of which was on the property of Timothy Quinlan. In 1906, when he was Speaker of the Western Australian Legislative Assembly, Quinlan had been an advocate  for the building of the line.

A major bushfire, blamed on collapsed power lines, broke out at about noon on 29 December 2009 after outdoor temperature had reached  and the "catastrophic" fire risk rating had been used for the first time in the state.

Toodyaypedia

Since 2013, the Shire of Toodyay and the Toodyay Historical Society have collaborated with Wikipedia editors to create and maintain Wikipedia articles about heritage buildings in Toodyay and West Toodyay, and significant people in the towns' history. Plaques with QR codes have been attached to some buildings, linking to the corresponding articles.

References

External links

 Shire of Toodyay
 Toodyay Visitors Centre
 The Toodyay Herald online, including current and back issues
 

 
Populated places established in 1860